Tor Birger Arneberg (4 September 1928 – 23 September 2015) was a Norwegian sailor and Olympic medalist. He was born in Oslo. He received a silver medal in the 6 metre class with the boat Elisabeth X at the 1952 Summer Olympics in Helsinki, together with Johan Ferner, Erik Heiberg, Finn Ferner and Carl Mortensen.
He was an all-American ski jumper at Dartmouth College. He has been married to wife Jean for more than 50 years, and they have three daughters, Elisabeth, Marianne and Karin. He is a graduate of Harvard Business School. He was on the board of directors of Royal Caribbean Cruise Lines.

References

1928 births
2015 deaths
Harvard Business School alumni
Norwegian male sailors (sport)
Olympic sailors of Norway
Sailors at the 1952 Summer Olympics – 6 Metre
Olympic silver medalists for Norway
Olympic medalists in sailing
Norwegian expatriates in the United States

Medalists at the 1952 Summer Olympics
Sportspeople from Oslo